Ove Stokstad  (9 August 1939 – 5 February 2018) was a Norwegian printmaker and jazz musician.

He was born in Trondheim to Eva Prior Bergh and Rolf Colbjørnsen Stokstad, and was married to textile artist Gudrun Skeie Stokstad, who died in 2016.

He is represented with art works in a number of museums, including the National Gallery of Norway, and museums in Östersund, Reykjavik, Darmstadt, Couvin, Ottawa, Oregon, Boston and New York City. He was appointed professor at the Trondheim Academy of Fine Art from 1996 to 2002. As jazz musician Stokstad played clarinet and saxophones with jazz groups such as Bodega Band and Søyr, as well as leading his own ensembles. He also toured with Concerts Norway several times.

References

1939 births
2018 deaths
Musicians from Trondheim
Norwegian printmakers
Norwegian jazz musicians